Cosimo di Giovanni de' Medici may refer to:

Cosimo de' Medici ('the Elder', Pater Patriae) (1389-1464), first Medici ruler of Florence
Cosimo I de' Medici (1519-1574), his distant relative, the first Grand Duke of Tuscany